Mathieu Bénézet (7 February 1946 in Perpignan, Pyrénées-Orientales, – 12 July 2013 in Paris) was a French writer and poet.

Biography

Writer 
Bénézet's literary work is protean. Recognized primarily as one of the most important poets of his generation, he is also the author of numerous essays, texts in prose (mixing creation and reflections) and novels. He questions every discipline he invests. He also develops elegiac, lyrical forms, short or long poems, the dramatic poem, and so on. Never didactic (rather upsetting because upset), his poetry is crossed by his aesthetic or philosophical reflections.

Marqued, as a young man, by his meeting with André Breton and Louis Aragon, his work attempts a synthesis between their respective works. Deeply singular, this work will offer from his first books a new way. his influence will be considerable as it will play a central role in the 70s and 80s with poets such as Jacques Dupin or Anne-Marie Albiach. His love of poetry commanded his advances in his fields and his multiple support manifested as editor and essayist as well as man of radio.

Editor and radio personality 

In addition he directed several programs on France Culture, including Entre-revues and, until 2009, Reconnaissance à....

Publications 
1968: L’Histoire de la peinture en trois volumes, Éditions Gallimard, prefaced by Aragon
1970: Biographies, Gallimard
1976: Dits et récits du mortel, Ménippée, Flammarion
1978: L’Imitation de Mathieu Bénézet, melodrama, Flammarion
1979: La Fin de l’homme, unfinished novel, Flammarion
1979: Ceci est mon corps, 1, melange, Flammarion
1981: Pantin, canal de l’Ourcq, novel, Flammarion
1984: Choses parmi les choses, essay to see, Ubacs
1984: Le Travail d’amour, poetry, Flammarion
1986: Ceci est mon corps, 2, miscellanées, Flammarion
1987: Roman journalier, prose, Flammarion
1988: Votre solitude, poetry, Seghers
1988: L’Instant d'une quantité de parole, narrative, Éd. Comp'Act
1990: Les XXXX followed by Trente-Neuf Quatrains, poetry, Éd. Comp'Act
1991: Ubacs. Numéro 10. Mathieu Bénézet, Éditions Ubacs, Rennes
1994: L’Océan jusqu’à toi, rime, Flammarion
1996: Ode à la poésie, Éd. William Blake and Co
1996: André Breton, rêveur définitif, essay to read, Éditions du Rocher
1997: Simples considérations. Considérations simple, with Alain Coulange, Éd. du Rocher
1997: Eh ! L’homme qui fait des hommes..., essay to see, Adélie
1998: Détails apostilles, Flammarion
1998: Orphée, imprécation, Éd. Le Bel Aujourd'hui
1998: 'L’instant d’une quantité de parole, narrative, Éditions Comp’Act
1999: Moi, Mathieu Bas-Vignons, fils de..., novel, Actes Sud
2000: L’Aphonie de Hegel, poetry, Obsidian
2000: L’Homme au jouet d’enfant, Ubacs
2002: Naufrage, naufrage, novel, 
2002: Et nous n’apprîmes rien : poésie (1962-1979), Flammarion
2002: Le Roman de la langue, essay, followed by Écrire encore, 1997, Horlieu
2003: Images vraies, petit roman, le préau des Collines
2004: Tancrède, novel, Léo Scheer
2005: Ceci est mon corps, mélanges & miscellanées, Flammarion/Léo Scheer
2005: Mais une galaxie, une anthologie, 1977-2000, Obsidian & Le Temps qu'il fait, (Prix Antonin-Artaud)
2007: La Terrasse de Leopardi, Propos 2
2008: Ne te confie qu’à moi, Flammarion
2009: Jeunesse & Vieillesse & Jeunesse, Obsidian
2009: Après moi, le déluge, Léo Scheer
2009: Pourquoi ce corps que je n’ai pas, Fissile
2010: Il vient d'un enfant dans un autre livre, L’arachnoïde
2011: H. O. ou Hamlet omelette, Léo Scheer
2012: Le Roman des revues, essay, 
2013: La Chemise de Pétrarque, Obsidian
2014: Premier Crayon, Flammarion
2014: Les Mêmes, désolées, Fissile
2014: Le Ciel c'est l'accident, L'arachnoïde

Anthology
2012: Œuvre, 1965-2010, series "Mille & une pages", Flammarion

References

External links 
 Mathieu Bénézet on Babelio
 Mathieu Bénézet on France Culture
 Mathieu Bénézet, un ange dans le ciel de Bagneux on L'Humanité (23 July 2013)
 Publications de Mathieu Bénézet on CAIRN

20th-century French male writers
20th-century French poets
21st-century French poets
21st-century French male writers
French male poets
20th-century French essayists
21st-century French essayists
Prix Fénéon winners
French editors
French radio presenters
1946 births
People from Perpignan
2013 deaths
Deaths from cancer in France
French male non-fiction writers